Berlin Brandenburger Tor (in German Bahnhof Berlin Brandenburger Tor) – formerly Berlin Unter den Linden (1936-2009) – is an underground railway station in the central Mitte district of Berlin, Germany, located on the Unter den Linden boulevard near Hotel Adlon, Pariser Platz and Brandenburg Gate. It is served by the Berlin S-Bahn and U-Bahn, as well as local bus lines.

Overview

The station opened on 27 July 1936 in the course of the building of the Nord-Süd Bahn tunnel. Train service discontinued on 21 April 1945 and could not be resumed until 2 December 1946 as the tunnel was flooded. The station was again closed with the construction of the Berlin Wall on 13 August 1961 and for decades became one of Berlin's ghost stations, as while both terminals of the Nord-Süd railway line were located in West Berlin, the station itself was located in the East. Unter den Linden later reopened on 1 September 1990, following the German reunification.

On completion of the new U55 line of the Berlin U-Bahn from Berlin Hauptbahnhof, the U-bahn station started operations as its temporary southern terminus and as an interchange with the Nord Süd S-Bahn lines. Both the U-Bahn and the S-Bahn station were renamed Brandenburger Tor in 2009 to distinguish them from Unter den Linden U-Bahn station at the junction of Unter den Linden with the Friedrichstraße. The U5 line through the station to the east opened on 4 December 2020.

Gallery

See also
Unter den Linden U-bahn station

References

External links

Station information 

Berlin S-Bahn stations
U5 (Berlin U-Bahn) stations
Railway stations located underground in Berlin
Buildings and structures in Mitte
Berlin Brandenburger Tor